Emancipation Garden is a park in Saint Thomas, U.S. Virgin Islands

The park was built to commemorate the freeing of the slaves which took place on July 3, 1848. A commemorative plaque, a bronze bust of a freed slave blowing a conch shell, and a replica of the Liberty Bell are featured. The park was also ringed with a fence of old ships' anchor chain and cannons recovered from the harbor.

The park is surrounded by historical buildings, including the Emancipation Garden Post Office and Government House.  Official government ceremonies are frequently held here.

The trees shading the park are lignum vitae, one of the hardest and slowest growing trees on earth, and commonly used in colonial times as foundation posts for island buildings.

The gazebo hosts concerts and other activities throughout the year, including a free concert by Jimmy Cliff in 1980.

References

External links 
 stthomasvirginisland.com

Parks in the United States Virgin Islands